The Fatah–Hamas Mecca Agreement was signed between Fatah and Hamas in the city of Mecca on 8 February 2007, agreeing to stop the internal military confrontations in the Gaza Strip and form a government of national unity. Representatives from the Fatah side included the President of the Palestinian Authority Mahmoud Abbas and parliament member Mohammed Dahlan. The Palestinian Prime Minister Ismail Haniya and Khaled Mashal represented Hamas.

Content 

The Mecca Agreement contains four determinations:

 Stop and prevent the shedding of Palestinian blood; unite and confront the occupation; adopt the language of dialogue as the sole basis for solving the political disagreements
 Form a Palestinian national unity government
Activate and reform the PLO and accelerate the work of the preparatory committee based on the Cairo and Damascus Understandings
Political partnership on the basis of the effective laws in the PNA and on the basis of political pluralism

Mecca agreement text
The text of the Mecca Agreement:

Aftermath
The agreement failed to unite the Palestinian National Authority and the Hamas Administration in Gaza. A further implementation agreement was signed in Doha in 2012, ratified by May 2012 Cairo agreement, both yet failing to promote joint elections. With the boycott of the Hamas, the Palestinian local elections of 2012 took place in October, without participation of Gazan residents.

See also
Fatah–Hamas reconciliation process
Palestinian Cairo Declaration
Palestinian Prisoners' Document
Middle East peace efforts

References

Fatah–Hamas conflict
Hamas
Fatah
2007 in Saudi Arabia
2007 in the Palestinian territories
Intra-Palestinian peace efforts